Fernando González  (born ) is a Venezuelan male volleyball player. He was part of the Venezuela men's national volleyball team at the 2014 FIVB Volleyball Men's World Championship in Poland. He played with Chubut Voley.

Clubs
  Chubut Voley (2014)

References

Venezuelan men's volleyball players
Place of birth missing (living people)
1989 births
Living people
Volleyball players at the 2020 Summer Olympics
Olympic volleyball players of Venezuela
20th-century Venezuelan people
21st-century Venezuelan people